A tournament solution is a function that maps an oriented complete graph to a nonempty subset of its vertices. It can informally be thought of as a way to find the "best" alternatives among all of the alternatives that are "competing" against each other in the tournament. Tournament solutions originate from social choice theory, but have also been considered in sports competition, game theory, multi-criteria decision analysis, biology, webpage ranking, and dueling bandit problems.

In the context of social choice theory, tournament solutions are closely related to Fishburn's C1 social choice functions, and thus seek to show who the best candidates are among all candidates.

Definition 
In social choice theory, the binary relation typically represents the pairwise majority comparison between alternatives.

A tournament solution is a function  that maps each tournament  to a nonempty subset  of the alternatives  (called the choice set) and does not distinguish between isomorphic tournaments:

Examples 
Common examples of tournament solutions are:
 Copeland's method
 Top cycle
 Slater set
 Bipartisan set
 Uncovered set
 Banks set
 Minimal covering set
 Tournament equilibrium set
== References ==

Voting theory